74th parallel may refer to:

74th parallel north, a circle of latitude in the Northern Hemisphere
74th parallel south, a circle of latitude in the Southern Hemisphere